I, Alex Cross is the 16th novel in the Alex Cross series by James Patterson. It was released on Hardcover and Paperback on November 16, 2009 to positive reviews and positive reception. It is preceded by Alex Cross's Trial. Its success led to 5 sequel novels, Cross Fire, Kill Alex Cross, Merry Christmas, Alex Cross, Alex Cross, Run and Cross My Heart.

Plot summary
Detective Alex Cross is enjoying a birthday party with his family when he receives a call from his bosses informing him that Caroline, the 24-year-old only daughter of his late brother Blake, has been found murdered in Virginia. Cross and his girlfriend Briana Stone rush to Richmond, Virginia, and are shocked to discover that Caroline's body was found dismembered (most likely by a wood chipper) in the trunk of a car driven by someone with connections to organized crime.

Cross takes the case and one of his first stops is Caroline's apartment. Cross is shocked to discover she only lived a few miles from him and yet never contacted him. He is further shocked to discover that based on the apartment's locale and the extensive lingerie wardrobe inside, Caroline was a high-end escort. Further investigation reveals that several other young people with connections to high-end prostitution have also either been murdered or disappeared under suspicious circumstances and that Caroline's escorting activities took her to a secretive club in Culpeper, Virginia, called Blacksmith Farms, where she may have met an ultra-secretive masked character named Zeus.

During the course of his investigation, Cross is thwarted by various people in Washington, D.C.—including the Secret Service and the President of the United States—who all want Cross to hand over his investigation to them. Cross refuses and is almost forced to give up his investigative efforts when his old FBI friend Ned Mahoney recommends Cross follow up on a lead provided by a country farmer.

The lead turns out to be an escort who saw Zeus without his mask on. All escorts—like Cross's niece Caroline—who saw Zeus without his mask were quickly killed and their bodies dismembered. This escort, however, managed to escape, but not before being shot in the back. The farmer managed to find her and nurse her back to health. The escort reveals that Zeus is actually Theodore Vance, husband to current US President Maggie Vance. Theodore Vance has a compulsion for young escorts and is able to indulge in it with the help of various people (like his Secret Service detail) who want to keep it quiet to protect the current Presidential administration.

Cross goes to a party at the Kennedy Center in Washington, D.C. to question Theodore Vance about his connection to Zeus. Sensing that President Vance's administration is about to be brought down by Theodore Vance's arrest, Theodore Vance's personal Secret Service agent (Dan Cormorant), in a final act of loyalty to his country, shoots and kills Theodore Vance. Cormorant is immediately killed by other Secret Service agents.

By killing Vance, Cormorant has allowed the Vance presidential administration to survive and spared the country the embarrassment of a sex scandal. Instead, Theodore Vance will be remembered as a Presidential spouse who was tragically and inexplicably killed by a rogue Secret Service agent. The novel ends with Alex asking Bree to marry him as Kyle Craig gives Cross a phone call, stating that he wants to have "fun" with Cross, but he will give him a break since his case with Zeus.

Characters
 Alex Cross
 John Sampson
 Dan Cormorant
 Margaret Vance, President of the United States
 Theodore Vance, The First Husband 
 Walter Tillman, Vice-President
 Gabriel Reese, Chief of Staff
 Ned Mahoney
 Tony Nicholson
 Eddie Tucci
 Johnny Tucci
 Bree Stone
 Nana Mama
 Damon, Janelle, Alex Jr. 'Ali' 
 Kyle Craig (in epilogue)

Release
The book was released on paperback, hardcover book styles and released on audio book. Excerpts can be read at the official James Patterson website.

Critical reception
The book has been called "the best [and scariest] book since Along Came a Spider".

Sequels
Due to the novel's positive success, it was reported to have been given 5 sequels, Cross Fire, Kill Alex Cross, Merry Christmas, Alex Cross, Alex Cross, Run, and Save Alex Cross.

Film adaptation
It was reported that there would be a new Alex Cross movie, which was planned for a release of 2012. It was reported to be a reboot of the original series featuring Morgan Freeman with Tyler Perry being cast as the lead role of Cross. It was later rumored to be based on I, Alex Cross. This was later confirmed to be false, with the true adaption being Cross and the title was I, Alex Cross but according to director of the film, only to show to fans that their 'hero' was back in movies. Later the film's title was changed to plain Alex Cross to avoid confusion. While there is no adaption yet, it seems likely – or possible – that in the future there might be since after Alex Cross (based on Cross) and there will be a new sequel to it (based on Double Cross).

References

External links
 

Alex Cross (novel series)
2009 American novels
Novels set in Virginia
Little, Brown and Company books